This is a list of Vladimir Lenin's speeches.

Recorded 
A list of Lenin speeches between 1919 and 1921 recorded via gramophone.

References 

Lenin
Works by Vladimir Lenin